The 1962 Men's South American Volleyball Championship, the 5th tournament, took place in 1962 in Santiago.

Final positions

Mens South American Volleyball Championship, 1962
Men's South American Volleyball Championships
1962 in South American sport
1962 in Chilean sport
International volleyball competitions hosted by Chile